Úsvit, meaning "dawn" in Czech and Slovak, may refer to:

 Dawn - National Coalition, political party in the Czech Republic
 Dawn (Slovakia), political party in the Slovak Republic